La Grande Arche de la Défense ("The Great Arch of the Defense"), originally called La Grande Arche de la Fraternité ("Fraternity"), is a monument and building in the business district of La Défense and in the commune of Puteaux, to the west of Paris, France. It is usually known as the Arche de la Défense or simply as La Grande Arche. A  cube, La Grande Arche is part of the perspective from the Louvre to Arc de Triomphe, and was one of the Grands Projets of François Mitterrand.

Design and construction

A great national design competition was launched in 1982 as the initiative of French president François Mitterrand. Danish architect Johan Otto von Spreckelsen (1929–1987) and Danish engineer Erik Reitzel (1941–2012) designed the winning entry to be a late-20th-century version of the Arc de Triomphe: a monument to humanity and humanitarian ideals rather than military victories. The construction of the monument began in 1985, with most of the work being carried out by French civil engineering company Bouygues. Spreckelsen resigned in July 1986 and ratified the transfer of all his architectural responsibilities to his associate, French architect Paul Andreu. Reitzel continued his work until the monument was completed in 1989. It has a prestressed concrete frame covered with glass and is covered in Bethel Granite.

La Grande Arche was inaugurated in July 1989, with grand military parades that marked the bicentennial of the French Revolution. It completed the line of monuments that forms the Axe historique running through Paris. The Grande Arche is turned at an angle of 6.33° about the vertical axis. The most important reason for this turn was technical: with a Paris Métro station, an RER station, and a motorway all situated directly underneath the Arche, the angle was the only way to accommodate the structure's giant foundations. In addition, from an architectural point of view, the turn emphasises the depth of the monument and is similar to the turn of the Louvre at the other end of the Axe Historique. In addition, the Arche is placed so that it forms a secondary axis with the two of the highest buildings in Paris at the time, the Tour Eiffel and the Tour Montparnasse.

The two sides of the Arche house government offices. The roof section was closed in 2010 following an accident without injury and the marble tiles which had begun to peel off were replaced with granite ones. It opened again in 2017 after seven years of renovation work. It features panoramic views of Paris and includes a restaurant and an exhibition area dedicated to photojournalism.

The void contains skeletal shafts for panoramic lifts and a PTFE-and-fibreglass tensile-membrane sunshade known as the "Cloud" (Le nuage).

Gallery

Tenants
Organizations headquartered in the Grande Arche include the Bureau d'Enquêtes sur les Événements de Mer (BEAmer), the French marine accident investigation agency, in the southern portion.

See also

 List of tallest buildings and structures in the Paris region

References

Further reading 
 François Chaslin et Virginie Picon-Lefebvre, La Grande Arche de La Défense Electa-Moniteur, 1989
 Erik Reitzel Le Cube ouvert. Structures and foundations International conference on tall buildings. Singapore, 1984. 
 Erik Reitzel Les forces dont resultent quelques monuments Parisiens de la Fin du XXe siècle Le pouvoir et la ville à l'époque moderne et contemporaine, Sorbonne 2001.

External links
 Grande Arche (French and English)
Satellite image from Google Maps
 Panorama during a storm
 Grande Arche (in French)
 ERI.dk
 Grande Arche pictures in Art Days 

Triumphal arches in France
La Défense
Monuments historiques of Île-de-France
Skyscraper office buildings in France
Tourist attractions in Paris
Buildings and structures completed in 1989
Esports venues in France
1989 establishments in France